Sugar is a studio album and official first major release by South Korean duo 15&, It was released on May 26, 2014 by JYP Entertainment with the song of the same name serving as the lead track for the album. The album consists of ten tracks which also includes three tracks that have been previously released since 2012.

Background and release
In early April 2014, they released their third single, "Can't Hide It". On April 13, 2014, they made their comeback stage on K-pop Star 3 finale with "Can't Hide It." It was also revealed that their first album was scheduled to be released in May 2014. On May 26, 2014, the album was released digitally and physically along with the music video of their lead single on YouTube.

Promotions
15& first performed "Sugar" on May 25, 2014 at SBS's Inkigayo.

Live videos of the 6 tracks were upload on YouTube daily at 12pm (KST) beginning May 26–31, 2014.
Rain & Cry on May 26
Star on May 27
Not Today Not Tomorrow on May 28
Oh My God on May 29
Shy My Boy on May 30
Silly Boy on May 31

Track listing

Chart performance

Album chart

Sales

References

External links
 
 
 
 
 
 
 
 
 

2014 debut albums
Korean-language albums
JYP Entertainment albums
Genie Music albums